Chaltenia is a genus of ground beetles in the family Carabidae. This genus has a single species, Chaltenia patagonica. It is found in Argentina.

References

Trechinae